James Griffin (17 April 1899 – 22 March 1959) was an Irish Fianna Fáil politician. He was elected to Dáil Éireann as a Fianna Fáil Teachta Dála (TD) for the Meath constituency at the 1957 general election. He died in 1959 during the 16th Dáil, a by-election was held on 22 July 1959 which was won by Henry Johnston of Fianna Fáil.

References

1899 births
1959 deaths
Fianna Fáil TDs
Members of the 16th Dáil
Politicians from County Meath